The 2022–23 Biathlon World Cup – Pursuit Women started on 4 December 2022 in Kontiolahti and will conclude on 18 March 2023 in Oslo Holmenkollen.

Competition format 
The  pursuit race is skied over five laps. The biathlete shoots four times at any shooting lane, in the order of prone, prone, standing, standing, totalling 20 targets. For each missed target a biathlete has to run a  penalty loop. Competitors' starts are staggered, according to the result of the previous sprint race.

2022–23 Top 3 standings

Events summary

Standings 
Intermediate standings after 5 competitions.

References 

Pursuit Women